Alan Burns may refer to:

Alan Burns, 4th Baron Inverclyde (1897–1957), Scottish nobleman
Alan Burns (author) (1929–2013), English author
Alan Burns (colonial administrator) (1887–1980), British colonial administrator and governor
Alan Burns (professor), professor of computer science
Alan Burns (rugby league) (born 1961), Australian rugby league footballer
Alan Burns & Associates, who developed the Movin' radio format

See also
Allan Burns (disambiguation)
Allen Burns (1870–1925), Australian rules footballer
Allen Burns, designer of Ottawa Street Power Station 
Larry Alan Burns (born 1954), United States federal judge
Alan Byrne (disambiguation)